The Saviour (also translated as Salvation or The Redeemer) was a militant nationalist organization which claimed credit for the August 2006 Moscow market bombing. Media reports indicate that the market, located near Cherkizovsky, was targeted due to its high volume of Central Asian and Caucasian clientele.

Four members of The Saviour were sentenced to life imprisonment, while four others received lesser prison terms.

See also 

 Combat Terrorist Organization
 NS/WP Crew
 National Socialist Society
 Primorsky Partisans

References

Anti-Asian sentiment in Russia
Anti-Caucasus sentiment in Russia
Anti–Central Asian sentiment in Russia
Far-right politics in Russia
Racism in Russia
Russian nationalist organizations
Terrorism in Russia
Neo-fascist terrorism
Paramilitary organizations based in Russia